Andrés Caparrós García (c. 1825 – c. 1900) was Mayor of Ponce, Puerto Rico, from 1 October 1881 to 28 September 1882.

Mayoral term
Caparrós García is best remembered because during his mayoral administration the city of Ponce came to be called "la villa de los jíbaros progresistas" (village of the progressive jíbaros). His term ended on 28 September 1882, when he went to San Juan to become mayor there.

References

See also

Ponce, Puerto Rico
List of Puerto Ricans
List of mayors of Ponce, Puerto Rico

Mayors of Ponce, Puerto Rico
1820s births
1900s deaths
Year of birth uncertain
Year of death uncertain